Ashwini Kakkar is an Indian entrepreneur and philanthropist, currently serving as the Chairman of Action Against Hunger, a global humanitarian organization established in 1979 by a group of French doctors, scientists, and writers and is committed to ending world hunger. He is a former chairman of Mercury Travels and co-founder and chairman of Via.com.

In 2006, he was honoured with the highest civilian award Chevalier de Ordre national du Mérite by the President of France Jacques Chirac. He is also the president of the Travel Agents Association Of India, chairman of the World Travel and Tourism Council (WTTC), and a global director of the Universal Federation of Travel Agent Associations (UFTAA).

Early life
Ashwini attended St. Xavier's in Delhi, St. Stanislaus, and Elphinstone College in Mumbai. He earned a bachelor's degree from the National Institute of Technology at Kurukshetra, where he received a Distinguished Alumni Award.

He then got an MBA from INSEAD, France, and a PGDM from the Indian Institute of Management Kolkata in 1980. He also completed the IRDA regulatory Insurance exams.

Career
Ashwini has launched several travel ventures in India, including Thomas Cook India, Mercury Travel and Via.com. He was an executive director on the global board of Thomas Cook Group, a travel group founded by Thomas Cook in 1841 and sold to C&N Touristic in 2000, and the president of the Bombay Chamber of Commerce and Industry from 2004 to 2005.

He was elected as a global board member of Recipharm, one of the five largest pharmaceutical contract development and manufacturing organizations (CDMO) in the world, listed on Nasdaq Stockholm since 2014, and sits on the board of The Travel Partnership Corporation, a Washington D.C. non-profit corporation.

Ashwini has also served as a director on many boards, including Deposit Insurance and Credit Guarantee Corporation (Reserve Bank of India), Alliance Capital, Pramerica, Europ Assistance India, Himalayan Exploration, Jai Medica, and Himalayan Exploration.

In 2006, he co-founded an online travel company, Via.com alongside Vinay Gupta, Amit Aggarwal, Harsh Azad and Rohit Gaddi, which was later sold to an American technology company Ebix in a $74.9 million deal.

In 2006, President of France Jacques Chirac honored him with the highest civilian awards 'Chevalier de l'Ordre de Merite'. Ashwini is a 'Distinguished Fellow' of the Institute of Directors London.

Ashwini was also awarded the ''Ordre national du Merite'' by French Ambassador to India Dominique Girad for his contribution in promoting Indo-French relations.

He is a collector of modern and contemporary Indian art.

In 2021, Ashwin took over as International President of Action Against Hunger, succeeding Raymond Debbane. He was previously the president of the network in India before being nominated for the global position.

Awards and honours
 Distinguished Alumni Award
 Chevalier de l'Ordre de Merite
 Ordre national du Merite

References

External links
 Ashwin Kakkar

Living people
Year of birth missing (living people)
Businesspeople from Mumbai
INSEAD alumni
Knights of the Ordre national du Mérite
Recipients of the Ordre national du Mérite